Neverov Bor is a rural locality (a settlement) in Sudskoye Rural Settlement, Cherepovetsky District, Vologda Oblast, Russia. The population was 184 as of 2002. There are 4 streets.

Geography 
Leontyevka is the nearest rural locality.

References 

Rural localities in Cherepovetsky District